Karizak-e Kenar Kal (also Romanized as Kārīzak-e Kenār Kāl; also known as Kārīzak, Kārīzak-e Kāl, and Kārīzak Kāl) is a village in Darbqazi Rural District, in the Central District of Nishapur County, Razavi Khorasan Province, Iran. At the 2006 census, its population was 507, in 124 families.

References 

Populated places in Nishapur County